Big Pal is a 1925 American silent sports drama film directed by John G. Adolfi and starring William Russell, Julanne Johnston and Mary Carr. A newly restored copy exists at the Library of Congress. It was released in Britain in 1926, distributed by Wardour Films.

Synopsis
A judge's daughter spurns his wealthy lifestyle and goes to do social work in poorer neighborhoods. There she meets a boxer contending for a championship.

Cast
 William Russell as Dan Williams 
 Julanne Johnston as Helen Truscott 
 Mary Carr as Mary Williams 
 Mickey Bennett as Johnny Williams 
 Hayden Stevenson as Tim Williams 
 Henry A. Barrows as Judge Truscott 
 Frank Hagney as Bill Hogan
 Alison Skipworth as Agatha Briggs, truant officer (*uncredited)

References

Bibliography
 Munden, Kenneth White. 'he American Film Institute Catalog of Motion Pictures Produced in the United States, Part 1''. University of California Press, 1997.

External links

The film available at the Library of Congress website

1925 films
1920s sports drama films
American sports drama films
Films directed by John G. Adolfi
American silent feature films
American black-and-white films
American boxing films
1925 drama films
1920s English-language films
1920s American films
Silent American drama films
Silent sports drama films